Oxley County, New South Wales is one of the 141 Cadastral divisions of New South Wales. It is located between the Bogan River on the west, and the Macquarie River on the east. This is the area approximately between Warren and Nyngan.

Oxley County was named in honour of Surveyor-General and explorer John Joseph William Molesworth Oxley (1785-1828).

Parishes within this county
A full list of parishes found within this county; their current LGA and mapping coordinates to the approximate centre of each location is as follows:

References

Counties of New South Wales